Ajay Nanavati (born 25 April 1956) was the former Managing Director of 3M Company, the only publicly listed subsidiary. He is currently the Chairman of Syndicate Bank.

Early and personal life
His son is Akshay Nanavati.

Career
Nanavati worked for the Birla Group and moved to 3M when it started as Birla 3M in India in 1988. He consequently moved to Singapore, Austin, Minneapolis and Tel Aviv before moving back to Bangalore to head 3M's then independent operations as managing director. He has since become chairman of Syndicate Bank. He was also head of 3M operations in Sri Lanka.

References

External links
 

1956 births
Living people
3M people
Virginia Tech alumni